The 2019 NC State Wolfpack women's soccer team represented NC State University during the 2019 NCAA Division I women's soccer season.  The Wolfpack were led by head coach Tim Santoro, in his eight season.  They played home games at Dail Soccer Field.  This was the team's 36th season playing organized women's college soccer and their 33rd playing in the Atlantic Coast Conference.

The Wolfpack finished the season 12–7–4, 4–2–4 in ACC play to finish in fifth place.  As the fifth seed in the ACC Tournament, they defeated Louisville in the Quarterfinals before falling to eventual champions North Carolina in the Semifinals.  They received an at-large bid to the NCAA Tournament where they defeated Navy and Arkansas before losing to BYU in the Round of 16.

Squad

Roster

Updated July 1, 2020

Team Management

Source:

Schedule

Source:

|-
!colspan=8 style=""| Exhibition

|-
!colspan=7 style=""| Non-Conference Regular season

|-
!colspan=7 style=""| ACC Regular season

|-
!colspan=7 style=""| ACC Tournament

|-
!colspan=7 style=""| NCAA Tournament

2020 NWSL College Draft

Source:

Rankings

References

NC State
NC State Wolfpack women's soccer seasons
2019 in sports in North Carolina